Archiș is a commune in Arad County, Romania. It is situated in the northern part of the Sebiș Basin, at the foot of the Codru Moma Mountains, and its surface is 68.07 km2. It is composed of four villages: Archiș (situated at 84 km from Arad), Bârzești (Barzafalva), Groșeni (Tönköd) and Nermiș (Nermegy).

Population
According to the 2002 census, the population of the commune is 1699. Ethnically, it has the following structure: 94.9% are Romanians, 0.2% Hungarians, 4.4% Roma and 0.5% are of other or undeclared nationalities.

History
The first documentary record of Archiș dates back to 1552. Bârzești, Groșeni and Nermiș were mentioned in
documents in 1580.

Economy
Although the economy of the commune is mainly agricultural, the secondary and tertiary economic sectors have also
developed since the 1990s.

Tourism
Among the commune's tourist attractions are the landscape at the western edge of Codru-Moma Mountains and the church of Pious Paraschiva (1725).

References

Communes in Arad County
Localities in Crișana

vi:Archis, Tavush